Dagney Kerr is a television actress, singer, and dancer best known for her roles as Nurse Ruth Ann Heisel on Desperate Housewives and Buffy's roommate Kathy on Buffy the Vampire Slayer. She is also known for appearances on George Lopez, E.R., Six Feet Under, and The District.

Biography
Kerr was born in Cincinnati, Ohio. She attended the Cincinnati School for the Creative and Performing Arts and apprenticed in the Cincinnati Ballet Company.

Filmography

Movies

Television

References

External links
Dagney's official site

Living people
Actresses from Ohio
American television actresses
American film actresses
Actresses from Cincinnati
Year of birth missing (living people)
20th-century American actresses
21st-century American actresses